The Duke Blue Devils football statistical leaders are individual statistical leaders of the Duke Blue Devils football program in various categories, including passing, rushing, receiving, total offense, defensive stats, and kicking. Within those areas, the lists identify single-game, single-season, and career leaders. The Blue Devils represent Duke University in the NCAA's Atlantic Coast Conference.

Although Duke began competing in intercollegiate football in 1888, the school's official record book considers the generally does not have many entries from before the 1930s, as records from before this year are often incomplete and inconsistent.

These lists are dominated by more recent players for several reasons:
 Since the 1930s, seasons have increased from 10 games to 11 and then 12 games in length.
 The NCAA didn't allow freshmen to play varsity football until 1972 (with the exception of the World War II years), allowing players to have four-year careers.
 The NCAA only began counting bowl games toward single-season and career statistics in 2002. The Blue Devils have played in six bowl games since that time, all in the 2010s. This means almost all of the most recent Duke players have had at least one extra game each season in which to accumulate statistics.
 The Blue Devils also played in the 2013 ACC Championship Game, giving players in that season yet another game in which to accumulate statistics.

These lists are updated through Duke's game against North Carolina A&T on September 7, 2019.

Passing

Passing yards

Passing touchdowns

Rushing

Rushing yards

Rushing touchdowns

Receiving

Receptions

Receiving yards

Receiving touchdowns

Total offense
Total offense is the sum of passing and rushing statistics. It does not include receiving or returns.

Total offense yards

Touchdowns responsible for
"Touchdowns responsible for" is the NCAA's official term for combined passing and rushing touchdowns.

Defense

Interceptions

Tackles

Sacks

Kicking

Field goals made

Field goal percentage

References

Duke